Alan Stuart Paterson (24 January 1902 – 16 June 1968) was a New Zealand cartoonist, illustrator, museum and art gallery curator. He was born in Hāwera, Taranaki, New Zealand in 1902.

References

1902 births
1968 deaths
People from Hāwera
New Zealand curators
New Zealand illustrators
New Zealand cartoonists